Solid HarmoniE is the self-titled debut studio album by British-American girl group Solid HarmoniE, released in 1997, by Jive Records. It is also their only album to date. It features their two biggest hit singles "I'll Be There For You" and "I Want You To Want Me". It was certified Gold in the Netherlands where it peaked at number two and spent 24 weeks in the album chart. It peaked in the top 5 in Finland.

The album spawned four singles: "I'll Be There for You", "I Want You to Want Me", "I Wanna Love You" and "To Love Once Again". The former three peaked in the top 20 in their native United Kingdom.

Track listing

Charts

Certifications

References

1997 debut albums
Jive Records albums
Albums produced by Max Martin
Albums recorded at Cheiron Studios